Claudia Tosse is a Swiss wheelchair curler.

At the national level, she is a 2007 Swiss wheelchair champion curler.

At the international level, she is a  silver medallist.

Teams

References

External links 

Living people
Swiss female curlers
Swiss wheelchair curlers
Swiss wheelchair curling champions
Year of birth missing (living people)
Place of birth missing (living people)